Germany at the UCI Road World Championships is an overview of the German results (East German and West German results excluded) at the UCI Road World Championships.

List of medalists 
This a list of elite and under-23 German medals.
Since the 2012 UCI Road World Championships there is the men's and women's team time trial event for trade teams and these medals are included under the UCI registration country of the team.

Sources

Medals by year

Medals by discipline
Updated after 21 September of the 2015 UCI Road World Championships

References

Nations at the UCI Road World Championships
Germany at cycling events